Dowlatabad (also Romanized as Dowlatābād and Daulatābād) is a village in Neyzar Rural District, Salafchegan District, Qom County, Qom Province, Iran. At the 2006 census, its population was 103, in 42 families.

References 

Populated places in Qom Province